The Kitchen is the third studio album by American hip hop collective Hieroglyphics. It was released by Hieroglyphics Imperium Recordings on July 16, 2013. It peaked at number 14 on the Billboard Heatseekers Albums chart, as well as number 45 on the Top R&B/Hip-Hop Albums chart.

Music videos were created for "Gun Fever", "It's Partly Me", and "Golden".

Critical reception
Ian Birnam of The Daily Californian said, "with its smooth rhymes and crunchy beats, The Kitchen is a definitive reminder of Hiero's stance in the hip-hop world."

Track listing

Personnel
Credits adapted from liner notes.

 Sleeprockers – production (1), editing, mixing
 Del the Funky Homosapien – production (2, 4)
 Gully Duckets – production (3, 5)
 Opio – production (6, 7, 9, 10, 11, 12, 13, 16)
 Unjust – production (8)
 A-Plus – production (14)
 Phesto Dee – production (15)
 Steven King – production (17)
 Ken Lee – mastering
 Spencer Groshong – artwork
 Leo Docuyanan – photography

Charts

References

External links
 

2013 albums
Hieroglyphics (group) albums
Hieroglyphics Imperium Recordings albums